Thestor yildizae, the peninsula skolly, is a species of butterfly in the family Lycaenidae. It is endemic to South Africa, where it is only found on the high slopes of the Cape Peninsula Mountains in the Western Cape.

The wingspan is 25–32 mm for males and 28-36.5 mm for females. Adults are on wing from late November to early February. There is one generation per year.

Larvae have been found in the nests of the pugnacious ant (Anoplolepis custodiens), but the larval food is unknown.

References

Y
Endemic butterflies of South Africa
Natural history of Cape Town
Butterflies described in 1983
Taxonomy articles created by Polbot